Dichloromethyl methyl ether (HCl2COCH3) is an organic compound that belongs to the class of ethers with a dichloromethyl group and a methyl group. It can be synthesized from methyl formate and a mixture of phosphorus pentachloride and phosphorus oxychloride or by chlorination of chlorodimethyl ether. 

The compound is used in the formylation of aromatic compounds (Rieche formylation) and as a chlorination agent in the formation of acid chlorides.

References

Ethers
Organochlorides
Reagents for organic chemistry